Dřínov is a municipality and village in Kladno District in the Central Bohemian Region of the Czech Republic. It has about 300 inhabitants.

Administrative parts
The village of Drchkov is an administrative part of Dřínov.

References

Villages in Kladno District